The  is a home video game console made by Epoch Co. and released in Japan on July 17, 1984, and in Europe, specifically France, later in 1984.  A successor to the Cassette Vision, it competed with Nintendo's Family Computer and Sega's SG-1000 line in Japan.

History
Epoch's original Cassette Vision was introduced in Japan by Epoch in 1981, which had steady sales and took over 70% of the Japanese home console market at the time, with around 400,000 units sold.  However, the introduction of next-generation systems from Nintendo, Casio and Sega quickly pushed back the original Cassette Vision, leading Epoch to quickly develop a successor.  The Super Cassette Vision was released in 1984 at a cost of ¥14,800 yen, featuring an 8-bit processor and better performance more in line with its competitors. It was later released in France by ITMC under the Yeno branding. At least 16 games were brought over from Japan for a European release. A version of the system targeted the young female market, the Super Lady Cassette Vision. The console came packed in a pink carrying case, alongside the game Milky Princess. The system did not take off, and was unable to match the massive popularity of the Nintendo Famicom, leading Epoch to drop out of the console market by 1987.

Technical specifications

 CPU: 8-bit NEC µPD7801G microcontroller @ 4 Mhz
 RAM: 128 bytes (internal to CPU)
 ROM: 4 KB (internal to CPU)
 Video processor: EPOCH TV-1 @ 14 Mhz
 VRAM: 4 KB (2 × µPD4016C-2) + 2 KB (EPOCH TV-1 internal)
 Colors: 16
 Sprites: 128
 Display: 309×246
 Sound processor: µPD1771C @ 6 MHz 
 Sound: 1 channel (tone, noise or 1-bit PCM)
 Controllers: 2 × hard-wired joysticks

Games

 1. Astro Wars - Invaders from Space
 2. Astro Wars II - Battle in Galaxy
 3. Super Golf
 4. Super Mahjong
 5. Super Base Ball
 Giants Hara Tatsunori no Super Base Ball
 6. Punch Boy
 7. Elevator Fight
 8. Lupin III
 9. Nebula
 10. Wheelie Racer
 11. Boulder Dash
 12. Miner 2049er
 13. Super Soccer
 14. Comic Circus
 15. Milky Princess
 16. Pop and Chips
 17. Nekketsu Kung-Fu Road
 18. Star Speeder
 19 TonTon Ball
 20. Super Sansu-Puter
 21. Shogi Nyuumon
 22. Doraemon
 23. BASIC Nyuumon (included four basic games)
 24. Dragon Slayer
 25. Rantou Pro-Wrestling
 26. WaiWai(Y2) Monster Land
 27. Dragon Ball: Dragon Daihikyō
 28. Mappy
 29. Sky Kid
 30. Pole Position II

Unreleased games 

 Black Hole
 Super Derby
 Super Rugby

External links 
Super Cassette Vision at www.old-computers.com

References

Products introduced in 1983
Home video game consoles
Third-generation video game consoles